Mancinella echinulata, common names Lamarck's spiny rock shell, Lamarck's spiny rock snail, is a species of sea snail, a marine gastropod mollusk, in the family Muricidae, the murex snails or rock snails.

Distribution
This marine species occurs off New Caledonia.

References

 Souverbie, M. (1861) Descriptions d'espèces nouvelles de l'Archipel Calédonien. Journal de Conchyliologie, 9, 271–284, pl. 11.
 Claremont M., Vermeij G.J., Williams S.T. & Reid D.G. (2013) Global phylogeny and new classification of the Rapaninae (Gastropoda: Muricidae), dominant molluscan predators on tropical rocky seashores. Molecular Phylogenetics and Evolution 66: 91–102.

External links
 Blainville, H. M. D. de. (1832). Disposition méthodique des espèces récentes et fossiles des genres Pourpre, Ricinule, Licorne et Concholépas de M. de Lamarck, et description des espèces nouvelles ou peu connues, faisant partie de la collection du Muséum d'Histoire Naturelle de Paris. Nouvelles Annales du Muséum d'Histoire Naturelle. 1: 189-263, pls 9-12
 Küster, H. C. (1843-1860). Die Gattungen Buccinum, Purpura, Concholepas und Monoceros. In: Küster, H. C., Ed. Systematisches Conchylien-Cabinet von Martini und Chemnitz. Neu herausgegeben und vervollständigt. Dritten Bandes erste Abtheilung. 3(1): 1-229, pls 1-35. Nürnberg: Bauer & Raspe.

echinulata
Gastropods described in 1822